The Santa Fe Grande is a New Mexico chile pepper, also known as "Yellow hot chili pepper" and the "Guero chili pepper", is a very prolific cultivar used in the Southwestern United States. The plants are resistant to tobacco mosaic virus.

 
The peppers grow upright on 24" chile plants. Santa Fe Grande's fruit have a slightly sweet taste and are fairly mild in pungency. Fresno chile peppers are of the Santa Fe Grande group.

See also 
 Big Jim pepper
 Chimayó pepper
 Fresno chile
 New Mexico No. 9
 Sandia pepper
 New Mexico chile
 List of Capsicum cultivars

References

Capsicum cultivars
Chili peppers
Crops originating from North America
Cuisine of the Southwestern United States
Fruit vegetables
Mexican cuisine
Chile
Spices